The Piano Quartet No. 2 in E major, Op. 87 (B. 162), is a piano quartet by Antonín Dvořák. It was composed in summer 1889 at his country residence in Vysoká.

Structure 
The composition consists of four movements:

A typical performance takes approximately 35 minutes.

References

External links 
 
 , performed by Menahem Pressler and the Emerson String Quartet

1889 compositions
Compositions in E-flat major
Piano quartets by Antonín Dvořák